The Canon of Laws or Classic of Law is a lost legal code that has been attributed to Li Kui, a Legalist scholar and minister who lived in the State of Wei during the Warring States period of ancient China (475-220 BCE). This code has traditionally been dated to the early fourth century BCE. Still, scholars now widely consider it to be a forgery from the fifth or sixth-century CE.

According to the traditional account, which first appeared in the monograph on law (Xingfa Zhi 刑法志) of the Book of Jin, the Canon of Laws was the earliest legal canon of ancient China and became the basis for all later legal works. It is said that Legalist reformer Shang Yang took it to the State of Qin where it became the basis of the law of the State of Qin and later, the law of the Qin dynasty.

Although the original text has been lost, according to later records the Canon of Laws comprised six chapters:
 Theft and robbery law
 Treason law
 Prisoner or extent of justice law ( or )
 Law of arrest
 Miscellaneous law
 Law of possession

Notes

Other references
 “History of the Chinese Legal System”, Pu Jian, Central Radio & TV University Press October 2006 /D•209, Chapter four, second section.

Legal history of China
Zhou dynasty texts
Legalist texts
Wei (state)
Qin (state)
4th century BC in law